The 2016 FIFA Club World Cup (officially known as the FIFA Club World Cup Japan 2016 presented by Alibaba YunOS Auto for sponsorship reasons) was the 13th edition of the FIFA Club World Cup, a FIFA-organised international club football tournament between the winners of the six continental confederations, as well as the host nation's league champions. The tournament was hosted by Japan.

Barcelona could not defend their title as they were eliminated in the 2015–16 UEFA Champions League quarter-finals.

Real Madrid won their second Club World Cup, defeating hosts Kashima Antlers 4–2 after extra time in the final.

Host bids
The application process for the 2015–16 as well as the 2017–18 editions, i.e. two hosts, each hosting two years, began in February 2014. Member associations interested in hosting had to submit a declaration of interest by 30 March 2014, and provide the complete set of bidding documents by 25 August 2014. The FIFA Executive Committee was to select the hosts at their meeting in Morocco in December 2014. However, no such decision regarding the 2015–2016 host was made until 2015.

The following countries expressed an interest in bidding to host the tournament:
  (withdrew interest in November 2014)
 
Japan was officially confirmed as hosts of the 2015 and 2016 tournaments on 23 April 2015.

Qualified teams

Venues
On 9 June 2016, Suita City Football Stadium in Osaka and International Stadium Yokohama in Yokohama were named as the two venues of the tournament.

Match officials
The appointed match officials were:

Video assistant referees were tested during the tournament. The system was used for the first time when a penalty was awarded by referee Viktor Kassai in the first half of the semi-final between Atlético Nacional and Kashima Antlers after a review of video replay.

Squads

Each team had to name a 23-man squad (three of whom must be goalkeepers). Injury replacements were allowed until 24 hours before the team's first match. The official squads (excluding the host team, who was yet to be determined) were announced on 1 December 2016.

Matches
The schedule of the tournament was announced on 15 July 2016.

A draw was held on 21 September 2016, 11:00 CEST (UTC+2), at the FIFA headquarters in Zürich, Switzerland, to determine the positions in the bracket for the three teams which enter the second round.

If a match was tied after normal playing time:
For elimination matches, extra time would be played. If still tied after extra time, a penalty shoot-out would be held to determine the winner.
For the matches for fifth place and third place, no extra time would be played, and a penalty shoot-out would be held to determine the winner.

On 18 March 2016, the FIFA Executive Committee agreed that the competition would be part of the International Football Association Board's trial to allow a fourth substitute to be made during extra time.

All times are local, JST (UTC+9).

First round

Second round

Match for fifth place

Semi-finals

Match for third place

Final

Goalscorers

1 own goal
 Ricardo Nascimento (Mamelodi Sundowns, against Jeonbuk Hyundai Motors)
 Miguel Samudio (América, against Atlético Nacional)

Awards

The following awards were given at the conclusion of the tournament.

FIFA also named a man of the match for the best player in each game at the tournament.

References

External links
FIFA Club World Cup Japan 2016, FIFA.com
FIFA Technical Report

 
2016
2016 in association football
2016
2016 in Japanese football
Sport in Osaka
Sport in Yokohama
December 2016 sports events in Japan